The Office of the Auditor General of Colombia is an autonomous organ of the state, and its auditor of the Government of Colombia directly subordinate of the Office of the Inspector General of Colombia.

References

Government agencies established in 1999
Auditor General
Government audit officials
1999 establishments in Colombia